The Lucius Frierson House is a historic mansion in Columbia, Tennessee, USA.

History
The house was completed in 1876. It was built for Lucius Frierson, a local businessman, and his wife, Sarah Catherine Morgan.

Architectural significance
It has been listed on the National Register of Historic Places since September 1, 1978.

References

Houses on the National Register of Historic Places in Tennessee
Italianate architecture in Tennessee
Second Empire architecture in Tennessee
Houses completed in 1876
Houses in Columbia, Tennessee
National Register of Historic Places in Maury County, Tennessee